Karel Novák (8 December 1890, Benešov – 23 November 1980, Prague), known professionally as Karel Nový, was a Czech writer and journalist.

Biography 
Karel Novák was born into the family of a poor baker. He published under the name Karel Nový and later adopted this name as his own. He studied at the grammar school in Benešov and his classmate in the third and fourth years was Vladislav Vančura with whom he became close friends.

Nový did not finish high school and, after several short-term jobs, began to study journalism. As a journalist, he worked with left-wing intelligentsia. During World War II, he was arrested in 1944 by the Nazi occupiers and interned in the Klecina labor camp (Klettendorf) in Silesia near Wrocław.

After the liberation, he worked gradually in several newsrooms, from 1952 to 1956 he was the editor-in-chief of the State Children's Book Publishing House. From 1956 he worked as a professional writer. In 1960 he was appointed National Artist.

Karel Nový died in 1980 in Prague and was buried in the Old Town Cemetery in Benešov. The grave of the Karel Nový family in the Old Town Cemetery in Benešov.

Works 
The literary work of Karel Nový covers many genres: from feuilletons and short stories to long novels, from books for children and youth to theatrical plays and film scripts. His work is often classified as critical realism, he often dealt with social issues.

 Městečko Raňkov – 1927
 Železný kruh (trilogy):
 Samota Křešín – 1927
 Srdce ve vichru – 1930
 Tváří v tvář – 1933
 Peníze – 1931
 Chceme žít – 1933
 Atentát –Rytíři a lapkové (nejprve pod názvem Železo železem se ostří) 1940
 Balada o českém vojáku 1945, román.
 Česká bouře – 1948
 Plamen a vítr: z letopisů městečka Raňkova – 1959
 Zaváté stopy – 1955
 Zahořklé úsměvy – 1959

Children's literature 

 Rybaříci na modré zátoce – 1936
 Potulný lovec: román z lišákova života – 1941
 Nehasnoucí ohně: povídky ze starých dob – 1951
 Básníkova první láska – 1962

Awards 

 Order of Labor 
 Klement Gottwald State Prize (1960)
 Honored Artist of Czechoslovakia (1954)
 National Artist of Czechoslovakia (1960)

References

1890 births
1980 deaths
People from Benešov
20th-century Czech writers
Czech children's writers
Czech journalists
20th-century Czech novelists
Czech short story writers
Socialist realism writers
Merited Artists of Czechoslovakia